

The following lists events that happened during 1938 in Afghanistan.

Afghanistan made rapid strides towards western civilization. Roads were laid out for motor traffic; industries, based originally on military requirements, were developed; and education spread. Three colleges were instituted in Kabul, and schools were set up everywhere.

Incumbents
 Monarch – Mohammed Zahir Shah
 Prime Minister – Mohammad Hashim Khan

Early 1938
Treaties of friendship are concluded with Liberia and with Brazil, and the treaty with Turkey is extended for ten years. On the other hand, on the proposal of the Soviet government, the Afghan consulates in Russia and the Soviet consulates in Afghanistan are closed.

June 1938
A number of Wazirs from South and West Waziristan cross the Afghan frontier with the object of looting and of stirring up a rising against the reigning Afghan house. This movement is the result of an agitation carried on for some months in Waziristan by one Syed Mohammad Sadi, commonly known as the Shami Pir (Syrian imam), a priest from Damascus whose family is connected with the ex-king Amanullah. A rebellion breaks out in southeast Afghanistan, headed by the Suleiman khel, and the number of the insurgents soon rises to 2,000. The government, which has been watching the activities of the Shami Pir, is not taken unawares, and quickly sends to the scene of the disturbances two brigades with ten aeroplanes, which are soon after reinforced by two more brigades. The insurgents are defeated in two battles on June 22 and 24, and the revolt soon comes to an end.

References 

 
Afghanistan
Years of the 20th century in Afghanistan
Afghanistan
1930s in Afghanistan